Naval Medical Research Unit Five (NAMRU-5) was a research laboratory of the US Navy which was founded as a field facility of Naval Medical Research Unit 3 in Addis Ababa Ethiopia with a collecting station in Gambella on December 30, 1965 under an agreement between the US and Ethiopian governments. In 1974 NAMRU-5 was established as its own command and was housed in the Ethiopian Health and Nutrition Research Institute (former Imperial Central Laboratory Research Institute). The mission of NAMRU-5 was to conduct research and development on infectious diseases of military importance in sub-Sahara Africa. Gambella became the focus of a major malaria control effort and studies on malaria immunology. Applied research focused on the general areas of insect repellents, insecticide resistance, insect attractants and louse control. 

Members of the NAMRU-5 staff were also among the last Americans to ever see smallpox before its eradication. NAMRU-5 built collaborative research efforts with the U.S. Centers for Disease Control and Prevention; with local medical facilities, including the Haile Selassie University Medical School and various hospitals in Addis Ababa; and with the London School of Tropical Medicine, the University of Washington, Case Western Reserve University Department of Medicine and the University of Maryland School of Medicine. NAMRU-5 was disestablished in April 1977 following the communist takeover of the government of Ethiopia which ordered all members out of the country in 4 days. 
Fields of study included:
Louse borne typhus
Leptospirosis
Onchocerciasis
Congenital syphilis
Brancroftian filariasis
Trypanosomiasis (African Sleeping Sickness)
Crimean-Congo Hemorrhagic Fever
Leishmaniasis
Malaria
Yellow Fever
West Nile fever

Commanding officers 
 Captain Craig K. Wallace (1974-1976)

References 
 R&D Chronicles: Remembering NAMRU-5, the Navy's Medical Laboratory in Ethiopia, 1965-1977
 Navy Medical Research & Development News June 2012
 Navy Research timeline
 Photo of former site of NAMRU-5
 Wood OL et al. Crimean-Congo Hemorrhagic Fever, Thogoto, Dugbe, and Jos Viruses Isolated from Ixodid Ticks in Ethiopia
 Leptosporosis Survey of Rodents and domestic Animals in Ethiopia
 Friedmann PS Cell-mediated immunological reactivity in neonates and infants with congenital syphilis.
 Palmer TT Chloroquine Sensitivity of Plasmodium Falciparum in Ethiopia: II. Results of an In Vitro Test
 Leishmaniasis In The Sudan Republic 30. Final Epidemiologic Report

External links 
 Navy Medical Research timeline

Military medical research of the United States Navy
Ethiopia–United States relations